Kalvsund is a locality situated in Öckerö Municipality, Västra Götaland County, Sweden with 221 inhabitants in 2010.

References 

Populated places in Västra Götaland County
Populated places in Öckerö Municipality